El Greco Museum may be:

 El Greco Museum, Toledo, Spain
 El Greco Museum, Fodele, Crete